Cristian Teodor Fedor (born 19 November 1973 in Sighet) is a Romanian former footballer and coach.

Playing career

Romania and Brunei
Despite there being discrepancies between sources on the dates Fedor played for Universitatea Cluj, CFR Cluj, and Unirea Dej, all of them agree that he has plied his trade with Brunei DPMM, finalizing the transfer in December 2001 and earning a reported 300000 dollars a year.

Featured in the 2003 ASEAN Club Championship while in DPMM FC colors.

Penang

Flying in to Penang for a trial with Penang FA of the Malaysia Super League in 2004, the defender stood at 1.90m tall. Convincing the club to sign him with his display in a practice match versus Tanjong Pagar, Fedor filled in their third foreign import slot that season and was the second Romanian to have ever plied their trade in Malaysia. In order to collect his International Transfer Certificate, he missed the season opener facing Perlis and the second round against Kedah.

Honours

Club
DPMM FC
 Brunei Premier League
 Winner (1): 2002
 Brunei Super Cup
 Winner (1): 2002

References

External links
 Cristian Fedor Richmond Soccer Profile - all club statistics

1973 births
Living people
Romanian footballers
Romanian expatriate footballers
Romanian expatriate sportspeople in Malaysia
Expatriate footballers in Malaysia
Malaysia Super League players
FC Universitatea Cluj players
CFR Cluj players
Penang F.C. players
Association football defenders
Expatriate footballers in Brunei
Expatriate soccer managers in the United States
Romanian expatriate sportspeople in the United States
Expatriate soccer managers in Canada
Liga I players
DPMM FC players
Romanian football managers
FC Unirea Dej managers